The PLUS Expressways Berhad is the largest highway concessionaries or build–operate–transfer operator company in Malaysia. A member of the UEM Group, the company is also the largest listed toll expressway operator in Southeast Asia and the eighth largest in the world.

History 

The company was founded on 27 June 1986 known as Highway Concessionnaires Berhad, a member of the United Engineers Malaysia Berhad (UEM). On 13 May 1988, the Highway Concessionaires Berhad changed its name to Projek Lebuhraya Utara Selatan Berhad (PLUS). On 29 January 2002, PLUS Expressways Berhad was incorporated in Malaysia as a public company.

Eight years later, PLUS Malaysia Berhad (PMB) was incorporated on 29 November 2010 and became involved in investment holding.

On 29 November 2011, PMB completed the acquisition of PLUS Expressways Berhad's assets and liabilities. PMB became the holding company of Projek Lebuhraya Utara-Selatan Berhad (PLUS), Expressway Lingkaran Tengah Sdn Bhd (ELITE), Linkedua Malaysia Berhad (LINKEDUA), Konsortium Lebuhraya Butterworth-Kulim Sdn Bhd, Teras Teknologi Sdn Bhd, PLUS Helicopter Services Sdn Bhd and the substantial shareholder of Touch 'n Go Sdn Bhd. In addition, PMB also acquired Penang Bridge Sdn Bhd from UEM Builders Berhad.

Projek Lebuhraya Usaha Sama Berhad (PLUS), a wholly owned subsidiary of PMB, was incorporated on 27 July 2011 to undertake the consolidation of all highway concessionaries acquired under a single entity. The acquisition of all five highway concession assets was completed on 12 January 2012.

With the completion of the acquisition, PMB is the largest toll expressway operator in Malaysia and one of the largest in Southeast Asia, Asia, and the eighth largest in the world.

Pre-acquisition companies

List of the company members

Domestic

International

Company partner
 Central Nippon Expressway Company (NEXCO Central Japan) (since March 2009)

Persada PLUS

Persada PLUS is the main headquarters of the PLUS Malaysia Berhad (PMB). It is located at Subang Interchange of the New Klang Valley Expressway (NKVE) in Petaling Jaya, Selangor. The headquarters was formerly a site of PLUS and PROPEL section office for the New Klang Valley Expressway (NKVE). The headquarters has a football stadium which is a home of PLUS FC football club.

Current PLUS Expressways products

PLUSMiles
PLUSMiles is the toll rebate loyalty program. It was launched on 17 December 2008. It is the first and the only toll expressway loyalty programme in Malaysia. PLUSMiles cardholders can get toll rebates and merchandise from participating outlets. Each PLUSMiles card is equipped with a Touch 'n Go feature. The PLUSMiles card can also be used for toll payments and other services such as major public transport services in the Klang Valley, Selangor and parking facilities.

PLUSTrack
PLUSTrack is a prepaid electronic card for fleet subscribers. The PLUSTrack card program provides enhanced efficiency and better fleet monitoring for the fleet subscribers. Besides the ease of fleet toll payment, the program is packaged with an array of rewards and benefits.

PLUS Ronda
PLUS Ronda is the highway patrol unit. It was established on 1 April 1990. On 17 October 1998, the unit was given to the Royal Malaysian Police auxiliary police power.

Scope of work
 Provides 24-hour assistance to breakdown and accident vehicles.
 Provide towing services to the nearest safe place.
 Report traffic flow.
 Assist authorities during emergency
 Monitor and inspect facilities condition at laybys and rest and service areas.
 Implement auxiliary police authority.

PLUS Helicopter Services

PLUS Helicopter Services or PLUS Heli is the highway helicopter unit. It was established in 2010 and it is used for highway surveillance, air response team, emergency, search and rescue from the air. It is the only highway concessionary in the country to have the helicopter services. The first batch of Eurocopter EC120 Colibri helicopters was delivered in 2007.

Current inventory

See also 
 UEM Group
 PROPEL
 Touch 'n Go
 SmartTAG
 Litrak
 ANIH Berhad
 Malaysian Expressway System
 Transport in Malaysia
 List of toll roads

References

External links
 PLUS Malaysia Berhad 
 PLUS Helicopter Services Sdn Bhd
 Teras Teknologi Sdn Bhd
 PLUS Expressways mobile applications on Google Play
 PLUS Malaysia Berhad corporate brochure
 Plus Expressways Bhd, bloomberg.com

1986 establishments in Malaysia
 
UEM Group
Companies based in Petaling Jaya
Expressways company of Malaysia
Construction and civil engineering companies established in 1986
Transport companies established in 1986
Companies formerly listed on Bursa Malaysia
Privately held companies of Malaysia
Malaysian companies established in 1986